Ferreras de Abajo is a municipality located in the province of Zamora, Castile and León, Spain. According to the 2009 census (INE), the municipality has a population of 601 inhabitants.

Town hall
Ferreras de Abajo is home to the town hall of 2 towns:
Ferreras de Abajo (377 inhabitants, INE 2020).
Litos (102 inhabitants, INE 2020).

References

Municipalities of the Province of Zamora